Eurycaraspis incilis is an extinct petalichthid placoderm from the Middle Devonian of China.  It is closely related to Quasipetalichthys.

Anatomy
Eurycaraspis incilis differs from Quasipetalichthys by having a more circular-shaped skull.

Phylogeny
Eurycaraspis incilis is considered a basal petalichthyid, and is placed in Quasipetalichthyidae as Quasipetalichthys' sister taxon. Quasipetalichthyidae, in turn, is considered the sister group of Macropetalichthyidae.

References

Fossil taxa described in 1991
Placoderms of Asia
Petalichthyida
Placoderm genera